Iran competed at the 1964 Summer Olympics in Tokyo, Japan. 63 athletes represented Iran in the 1964 Olympics.

Competitors

Medal summary

Medal table

Medalists

Results by event

Aquatics

Diving 

Men

Swimming 

Men

Athletics 

Men

Women

Boxing 

Men

Cycling

Road 

Men

Fencing 

Men

Football 

Men

Gymnastics

Men

Women

Shooting 

Open

Weightlifting 

Men

Wrestling 

Men's freestyle

Men's Greco-Roman

References

External links
Official Olympic Reports
International Olympic Committee results database

Nations at the 1964 Summer Olympics
1964
Summer Olympics
Pahlavi Iran